Göyəm (also, Gegam, Gegem, and Gëgyam) is a village and municipality in the Zaqatala Rayon of Azerbaijan. It has a population of 4,155. The municipality consists of the villages of Göyəm, Dardoqqaz, Çökəkoba, and Sumaylı.

References

External links 

Populated places in Zaqatala District